The Norwegian Lutheran Memorial Church of Minneapolis (Norwegian Den Norske Lutherske Mindekirke), better known as Mindekirken, is a Lutheran church in Minneapolis in the U.S. state of Minnesota.  It is one of two American churches still using Norwegian as a primary liturgical language, the other being Minnekirken in Chicago, Illinois. King Harald V of Norway is the church's patron.

History
The congregation of Mindekirken was formed in 1922 by the Norwegian Lutheran Church of America in response to the rapid abandonment of Norwegian in favor of English among Norwegian Lutheran churches at that time.

The Norse-American Centennial Celebration that was held in Saint Paul, Minnesota, in 1925 to commemorate the 1825 arrival of the Norwegian immigrant ship Restaurationen helped provide the impetus for a "memorial" church to be built to house the new congregation. Mindekirken was finally dedicated on May 4, 1930.

The church has been visited by members of the Norwegian Royal Family on several occasions, including King Olav V of Norway's visit on November 4, 1975. (King Olav was the father of the current King, HM Harald V of Norway.)

Mission
Mindekirken's mission statement reads:
"To serve as a spiritual center for the Scandinavian American Community, worshiping in both Norwegian and English. To be a warm and inviting place for visitors and members alike, where people join in fellowship across different ages and cultural backgrounds. To encourage activities such as Leiv Eriksson International Festival, Syttende Mai Celebration, concerts, festive dinners and language classes."

See also
 Mindekirken is centrally located in the Ventura Village neighborhood within the  Phillips community of Minneapolis, MN.
 Mindekirken is in the Minneapolis Area Synod of the ELCA.
 Mindekirken was originally a member of the American Lutheran Church (ALC), until January 1, 1988, when it merged with the Lutheran Church in America (LCA) and the Association of Evangelical Lutheran Churches (AELC), thus creating the largest Lutheran church body in the United States.

References

External links
Mindekirken- Norwegian language church in Minneapolis
Minnekirken Norwegian language church in Chicago
Sjømannskirken Website of The Norwegian Church Abroad, which operates churches in San Francisco, Los Angeles, Houston, New Orleans, Miami and New York
 Mpls-synod.org of the ELCA
 Mindekirken's listing at the ELCA's Minneapolis Synod web site
 Mindekirken is centrally located in the Ventura Village neighborhood in the Phillips Community  of Minneapolis, Minnesota.
Photos
Norwegian Lutheran Memorial Church at the Minnesota Historical Society

Churches in Minneapolis
Christian organizations established in 1922
Lutheran churches in Minnesota
20th-century Lutheran churches in the United States
Norwegian-American culture in Minneapolis–Saint Paul

zh:挪威路德会纪念教堂 (明尼阿波利斯)